Opal Cortlandt is a fictional character from the ABC and The Online Network soap opera, All My Children. She was portrayed by Dorothy Lyman from 1981 to 1983, and by Jill Larson from December 13, 1989 to September 2, 2013. Larson was demoted from contract to recurring status from June 14, 2006 to December 2, 2009, before returning to contract status effective December 10, 2009. She remained on the show until the series finale on September 23, 2011, and appeared in the short-lived reboot in 2013.

Background
In the beginning, Opal was only supposed to remain on All My Children for about six weeks, but when the show's executives saw Dorothy Lyman's portrayal of the character, the writers kept her on and wrote more for the character.

The producers of the show disagreed with the way Lyman portrayed Opal:

Storylines
Opal and her daughter, Jenny, first came to Pine Valley in 1981. Opal was intent on getting her daughter into modeling. Until Jenny got her big break, Opal made her work at the sleazy bar, Foxy's, as a cocktail waitress while she was in high school so she could support them both. Later, Opal opened a beauty shop, which she called The Glamorama. She met a handsome widower, Ralph Purdy, whom she quickly became engaged to, and left Pine Valley. A few months later, Jenny died, and Tad called her (off-screen) to tell her the news.

In 1989, Opal returned to Pine Valley and joined forces with Palmer to break up Tad and Dixie's marriage. They soon fell in love and married in November 1990 after Palmer's ex-wife Daisy schemed to get them together. Later, the Cortlandts welcomed their son Peter (Petey) into the world. Their marriage was threatened by the psychotic Stan Ulatowski, Palmer's former prison mate who wanted Opal for himself.

Opal and Palmer's marriage was always filled with minor tiffs (including an affair that Palmer had with Janet Green in 1995, who, at the time, he believed was Jane Cox). After nine years in the summer of 1998, however, their marriage fell apart. Opal alerted the authorities when she learned that Palmer had stashed away a treasure trove of stolen Nazi artwork. While serving in the military, Palmer had stolen the paintings when his squadron defeated a Nazi platoon. Palmer refused to give back the paintings to their rightful owners. Palmer felt betrayed by Opal and became increasingly nasty to his wife. At about the same time, Opal learned that the son she'd been forced to abandon while she was still married to Ray Gardner, Adrian Sword, had arrived in Pine Valley. Opal had had an affair with Frank Dawson, a man who took her in when she was fleeing from the abusive Ray. Ray showed up at her hiding spot one day and forced Opal to leave with him. Opal was fearful that the child, an interracial baby, would be abused—or worse—if Ray got his hands on the infant so she claimed she was babysitting and walked out on the child. A twist of events took place and Adrian was part of a government operation tracking Palmer and his stolen paintings. Palmer eventually turned over the paintings, but his marriage to Opal was hopelessly in shambles. Adrian bullied Palmer into signing a divorce agreement that gave Opal fifty percent of everything he owned. The reasoning was that Palmer would never have gotten his money back if it were not for Opal's famous Purdified Chicken recipe that was served at the Chicken Shack. Palmer cleaned all of the valuable stuff out of Cortlandt Manor and moved into a suite at The Valley Inn.

After her ordeal with Palmer, Opal set out to start her life over. She renovated Cortlandt Manor and opened a salon, naming the Glamorama in honor of her former shop.  She was jealous as Palmer took on new love interests and was especially horrified when Palmer married scheming Vanessa Bennett, ordering her to stay away from their son, Petey. Over the years, Opal became confidante to the one and only Erica Kane, standing up for her and even getting in a cat-fight with Mary Smythe who was trying to win Jackson back away from her.

Opal maintained an active role in the lives of her family and friends while she adjusted to life without Palmer. She helped Tad mourn the loss of Dixie Cooney after she was presumed dead and she bonded with Krystal Carey, the mother of Tad's daughter Jenny. Opal also continued to have premonitions and read Tarot cards and tried to warn residents of Pine Valley whenever she foresaw something negative headed their way.

Palmer and Opal joined forces in voicing their concerns when their son Petey returned to Pine Valley and set his sights on Adam Chandler's daughter, Colby. Both Opal and Palmer were unable to dissuade Petey from teaming up with Adam in order to get closer to his daughter. Opal was disappointed when Palmer moved to Switzerland and Petey later joined him there.

In April 2010, Palmer made a return to Pine Valley and had intended to visit Opal, but before he had a chance to see her, he had a heart attack in his hotel room and died. Opal was devastated when she learned Palmer was dead and she admitted he was the love of her life. She lamented that she missed her opportunity to tell him that she loved him, but her friends and family assured her that Palmer knew how she felt about him.

Opal proved her loyalty to Erica when Erica was committed to Oak Haven after she stabbed David Hayward. Erica claimed she had been held hostage for months while a doppelgänger took her place and that David had known the woman that claimed to be Erica was an imposter. Erica was sent to Oak Haven for a psychiatric evaluation when no one except for Opal believed her story. Opal committed herself to Oak Haven and told Erica she was there to break her out. Tad realized what his mother was up to and took her home.

Erica's story was proven to be true, and she decided to make a trip to L.A. to search for a love from her past and she invited Opal to go with her. Opal initially accepted the offer but later declined when she reconnected with a love from her own past. Sam Brady and Opal met up at their high school reunion, although Opal's nemesis, Verla Grubbs, tried to separate Sam and Opal as she had done in the past. Sam made it clear he was only interested in Opal, and she went on a trip with him to see his home in Hawaii. When Opal returned from Hawaii, she celebrated the news of Tad and Dixie's engagement and she also planned to catch up with Erica. Instead, Opal saw Erica's fiancé Jackson moving out of the home he shared with Erica and broke the news to her friend that Jackson was leaving her. She also told Erica that Stuart Chandler was alive because of David and Adam was hosting a party later that evening to welcome Stuart home. Opal helped Erica devise a plan to win Jackson back and they attended Adam's party. When they arrived, they saw Jackson speaking with Krystal and Erica pulled him away for a private discussion. Opal continued to mingle with the other guests, many of which were her family and friends and she celebrated life in Pine Valley as a shot rang out.

References 

All My Children characters
American female characters in television
Fictional maids
Television characters introduced in 1981